The 1993–94 Rugby Football League season was the 99th ever season of professional rugby league football in Britain. Sixteen teams competed from August 1993 until May 1994 for a number of titles, primarily the Stones Bitter Championship.

Season summary
Stones Bitter League Champions: Wigan (15th title)
Silk Cut Challenge Cup Winners: Wigan (26-16 v Leeds)
Stones Bitter Premiership Trophy Winners: Wigan (24-20 v Castleford)
Harry Sunderland Trophy: Sam Panapa
Regal Trophy Winners: Castleford (33-2 v Wigan)
2nd Division Champions: Workington Town

The 1994 Man of Steel Award for player of the season went to Warrington's Jonathan Davies.

This season saw the highest ever away victory in the league when Keighley Cougars beat Highfield 104-4 at the Rochdale Hornets ground on 23 April.

This was the first season since the 1905–06 inaugural season of the Lancashire County Cup and Yorkshire County Cup, except for the break for World War I and World War II (Lancashire Cup only), that the Lancashire Cup and Yorkshire Cup competitions had not taken place.

Championship

Wigan, Bradford Northern and Warrington all finished the season on top of the ladder with 46 points, but Wigan's superior points differential saw them crowned League Champions for the fifth consecutive time. This earned them the right to travel to Australia at the close of the season and contest the 1994 World Club Challenge. Wigan defeated the Brisbane Broncos and confirmed their position as the dominant rugby league club of the year.

After finishing in second last and last place respectively, Hull Kingston Rovers and Leigh were demoted to the Second Division.

Second Division

Challenge Cup

The Silk Cut Challenge Cup Final was played between Wigan and Leeds on a Saturday afternoon, 30 April 1994 at Wembley Stadium, before a crowd of 78,348. Bonnie Tyler lead the community singing at the match. Wigan's Martin Offiah opened the scoring with a ninety-plus metre try, and went on to win the game 26–16.

League Cup

Premiership

Statistics
The following are the top points scorers in the 1993–94 season.

Most tries

Most goals (including drop goals)

References

Sources
1993–94 Rugby Football League season at rlhalloffame.org.uk
1993–94 Rugby Football League season at wigan.rlfans.com
Wigan's record Cup run at news.bbc.co.uk
Great Britain Competitions 1993-1994 at hunterlink.net.au
Championship 1993/94 at rugbyleagueproject.org

1993 in English rugby league
1994 in English rugby league
Rugby Football League seasons